Torsukattak (old spelling: Torssukátak) may refer to the following landforms in Greenland, from north to south:

 Torsukattak Strait (Upernavik Archipelago), a strait in the southern part of Upernavik Archipelago
 Torsukattak Strait, a strait in the inner part of Uummannaq Fjord
 Torsukattak Sound, a sound in Umivik Bay, Eastern Greenland
 Torsukattak Fjord, a fjord in Southern Greenland
 Torsukattak Fjord (Disko Bay), a fjord in Western Greenland